Marios Siampanis (born 28 September 1999) is a Greek professional footballer who plays as a goalkeeper for Super League club Aris.

Club career
On 14 April 2015 it was announced that Siampanis signed a professional contract with PAOK and started training with the first team. On 10 February 2017 Siampanis extended his contract with PAOK until 2019.
According to reports, teenage goalkeeping prospect, Siampanis, could be on his way out of the club despite PAOK officials wanting to keep the talented shot-stopper. Having been at the club since he was just 16 years of age, the youngster has only made two appearances in the senior team and may look for greater opportunities elsewhere.

On 1 July 2019, the 19-year-old international never received a chance with the PAOK senior team, and with his contract expiring this summer, the talented goalkeeper took the decision to leave the club and pen a four years' deal with rival team Olympiacos for an undisclosed fee. On 11 August 2019, he joined English Championship club Nottingham Forest on a season-long loan deal from Olympiacos.

On 5 October 2020, following his release from Olympiacos, he signed a three-year contract with Aris.

International career
On 14 November 2017, Siampanis scored with a penalty kick equalizing the score in a final 2–1 win game against Russia U19 that helps Greece to be qualified for the Elite Round.

Honours
PAOK
Super League: 2018–19
Greek Cup: 2016–17, 2017–18, 2018–19

References

External links

1999 births
Living people
Greek footballers
Greek expatriate footballers
Greek expatriate sportspeople in England
Greece under-21 international footballers
Greece youth international footballers
Super League Greece players
English Football League players
PAOK FC players
Nottingham Forest F.C. players
Aris Thessaloniki F.C. players
Expatriate footballers in England
Association football goalkeepers
Footballers from Katerini